Bastion was a Yugoslav synth-pop band formed in Skopje in 1983. They were a prominent act of the 1980s Yugoslav rock scene.

The band was formed by keyboardist Kiril Džajkovski, vocalist Ana Kostovska and bass guitarist Ljubomir Stojsavljević. The band released only one self-titled studio album in 1985, for which the lyrics were written by Milčo Mančevski, later an acclaimed film director. After the group disbanded, Kostovska dedicated herself to her acting career, and Džajkovski joined Leb i Sol, later starting a successful career as an electronic music composer and performer.

History

1983–1987
The band was formed in April 1983 in Skopje, SR Macedonia by keyboardist Kiril Džajkovski, vocalist Ana Kostovska and bass guitarist Ljubomir Stojsavljević. The band released their debut self-titled album in 1985 through PGP-RTB. Music was composed by Džajkovski and Stojsavljević, and the lyrics were written by Milčo Mančevski, at that time a correspondent of the magazines Džuboks and Zdravo from New York City. Mančevski also directed the music video for the band's song "Hot Day in Mexico". The songs on the album were in Serbo-Croatian, but the band had also recorded several songs in their native Macedonian for the music production of the national Radio-Television Skopje. The group ended their activity in 1987.

Post breakup
After Bastion disbanded, Ana Kostovska dedicated herself to her acting career, occasionally making guest appearances on the albums by other Yugoslav acts. She appeared as vocalists on the albums by Leb i Sol, Riblja Čorba, Vlatko Stefanovski and The No Smoking Orchestra.

Kiril Džajkovski joined Leb i Sol, recording the album Kao kakao (Like Cacao, 1987) with them. He started his solo career with the album Synthetic Theatre, released in 1996. During the 1990s, he occasionally performed with the Australian band Kismet, formed by Mizar member Gorazd Čapovski. With Vlada Divljan, Džajkovski recorded the album Dekada (Decade, 1997) under the name Apartchicks. During the following years, he released a number of electronic music albums and wrote music for theatre and film. He cooperated with Mančevski's on his 2001 film Dust.

In 2006, PMG Recordings released the album Works and Rew>>works. The album featured remastered version of the Bastion's only album, as well as covers of the band's songs by Foltin, Superhiks and other Macedonian bands.

Discography

Studio albums
Bastion (1985)

Compilation albums
Works and Rew>>works (2006)

References

See also
Music of North Macedonia
SFR Yugoslav Pop and Rock scene

Macedonian rock music groups
Macedonian synthpop groups
Yugoslav rock music groups
Yugoslav synthpop groups
Electronic music groups
Musical groups established in 1983
Musical groups disestablished in 1987